The coat of arms of the Kingdom of Sweden has a greater and a lesser version.

Regulated usage 
The usage of the coats of arms is regulated by Swedish Law, Act 1970:498, which states (in unofficial translation) that "in commercial activities, the coats of arms, the flag or other official insignia of Sweden may not be used in a trademark or other insignias for products or services without proper authorisation. This includes any mark or text referring to the Swedish State which this can give the commercial mark a sign of official endorsement. This includes municipal coats of arms which are registered."

Any representation consisting of three crowns ordered two above one are considered to be the lesser coat of arms, and its usage is therefore restricted by law 1970:498.

Variants
The arms of Sweden were first formally codified by law in 1908. This law also formally codifies the differences between the "greater" and "lesser" arms. The present law prescribing the two arms dates from 1982.

Greater version
The greater coat of arms is blazoned in Swedish law as follows:

A shield azure, quartered by a cross Or with outbent arms, and an inescutcheon containing the dynastic arms of the Royal House. In the first and fourth fields three open crowns Or, placed two above one. In the second and third fields three sinisterbendwise streams argent, a lion crowned with an open crown Or armed gules. The inescutcheon is party per pale the arms for the House of Vasa (Bendwise azure, argent and gules, a vasa Or); and the House of Bernadotte (Azure, issuant from a wavy base a bridge with three arches and two towers embattled argent, in honor point an eagle regardant with wings inverted resting on thunderbolts Or, and in chief the Big Dipper constellation of the same). The main shield is crowned by a royal crown and surrounded by the insignia of the Order of the Seraphim. Supported by two lions regardant, crowned and with forked tails Or armed gules, standing on a compartment Or. All surrounded by purpure mantling doubled ermine, crowned with a royal crown and tied up with tasseled strings Or.

The greater arms may also be displayed only with the crowned escutcheon. While the arms have undergone significant changes over the years, such as changing the inescutcheon with the ruling dynasty, they are based on arms created by King Karl Knutsson in 1448.

The escutcheon used in the greater blazon has in total five elements: 4 quarterings on the main escutcheon (two coats of arms duplicated), and three coat of arms incorporated into an escutcheon of pretense. However, Bernadotte never used any stars in the arms of Pontecorvo (neither as Prince of Pontecorvo, nor as King of Sweden and Norway). The stars were introduced as an element in the royal coat of arms in the 19th century, chosen as a symbol of Sweden's eternal existence, as in the poem by Esaias Tegnér:

This symbol became especially popular through its allusion to the name that had been borne by so many famous Swedish kings. The Big Dipper, or as it is called in Swedish, Karlavagnen (Charles' Wain), adds a Swedish accent to the Bernadotte dynastic coat of arms much in the same way as do the Vasa arms.

The arms are supported by two lions with forked tails (queue fourchée), facing away from the shield and crowned with Royal Crowns. For centuries, the lion has been an important element in Swedish heraldry and especially for the State Coat of Arms. The shield may be surmounted by the Collar of the Order of Seraphim, the foremost order in Sweden, and the highest honour the Swedish state can bestow on an individual.

Besides being the official national coat of arms, the greater coat of arms is also the personal coat of arms of the king, and as such he can decree its use as a personal coat of arms by other members of the Royal House, with the alterations and additions decided by him.

Blazon: "The greater state arms consist of a head shield azure, quartered by a cross or with outbent arms, and an inescutcheon containing the dynastic arms of the Royal House.

In the first and fourth fields three coronets or, placed two above one. In the second and third fields three sinisterbendwise streams argent, a lion crowned with an open crown or with armaments gules. The inescutcheon is party per pale the arms for the House of Vasa and the House of Bernadotte. The main shield is crowned by a royal crown and surrounded by the insignia of the Order of the Seraphim. Supported by two lions regardant or crowned, with parted tails and armaments gules, standing on a postament. All surrounded by hermine mantling crowned with a royal crown and tied up with tasseled strings or."

Lesser version
The lesser coat of arms is mainly used by the Government of Sweden and subordinate State authorities. As such it may be joined by insignias symbolising the activity of individual government agencies, following approval by the State Board of Heraldry. It is, for instance, embroidered on all Swedish police uniforms and in various coats of arms of the Swedish Armed Forces, and is displayed on Sweden's passports and embassies.

Blazon: "Azure, with three coronets Or, ordered two above one." Crowned with a royal crown. The shield may also be surrounded by the insignias of the Order of the Seraphim."

See also 

Swedish heraldry
Three Crowns
Flag of Sweden
List of flags of Sweden

References

Sweden
National symbols of Sweden
Sweden
Sweden
 
Swedish heraldry
Sweden
Sweden
Sweden
Sweden
Sweden
Sweden